A digital anchor uses a location system (such as GPS) to provide dynamic positioning control of a stationary vehicle in a dynamic environment, such as a boat or ship being affected by currents and wind.

References 

Global Positioning System